Fort Portal or Kabarole is a city located in the Western Region of Uganda. It is the seat of both Kabarole District and historically of the Toro Kingdom.

Location
The geographical coordinates of Fort Portal City are 0°39'16.0"N, 30°16'28.0"E (Latitude:0.654444; Longitude:30.274444).

City Status

On 1st July 2020, Fort Portal was elevated from municipality to a "Tourism city" status. In 2019, in preparation for the award of city status, Ford Portal annexed several surrounding neighborhoods and sub-counties, including (a) Karago (b) Ibaale Parish (c) Burungu Parish (d) Karambi sub-county (e) Bukuku sub-county and (f) parts of Busoro sub-county.

Population
According to the 2002 national census, the population of Fort Portal was about 41,000. In 2010, the Uganda Bureau of Statistics (UBOS) estimated the population at 46,300. In 2011, UBOS estimated the population at 47,100. In August 2014, the national population census put the population at 54,275. In 2020 UBOS estimated the mid-year population of the city as 60,800. The population agency calculated that the population of the city grew at an average rate of 2.12 percent annually between 2014 and 2020.

Healthcare
Fort Portal is home to three hospitals. Fort Portal Regional Referral Hospital, a 300-bed public hospital administered by the Uganda Ministry of Health is the largest. The next-largest is Holy Family Virika Hospital, a private hospital with a bed capacity of 155, owned by the Roman Catholic Diocese of Fort Portal. The smallest of the hospitals is the 100-bed Kabarole Missionary Hospital, a community hospital administered by the Church of Uganda, originally founded by John Edward Church of the Church Mission Society.

Education
The city houses three institutions of higher learning. The main campus of Mountains of the Moon University, previously a private university, but now a public university, is located in the city center. Also located within the city is the main campus of Uganda Pentecostal University, a private university affiliated with the Pentecostal Movement. A new university, the Fins Medical University, was established in the city in 2018. St. Mary's Minor Seminary, a Catholic secondary school for prospective Catholic priests, is also located in Fort Portal.

Notable people
 Beenie Gunter: Dancehall artist
 Juliana Kanyomozi: Singer
 Andrew Mwenda: journalist
 Edward Rugumayo: politician, diplomat, author, academic and environmentalist
 Kayanja Muhanga: Lieutenant General in the UPDF. Commander of the Land Forces of the UPDF since October 2022.
 Nobel Mayombo (1965–2007): Brigadier General in he UPDF, lawyer and legislator.
 Margaret Blick Kigozi: Commonly known as Maggie Kigozi, is a Ugandan medical doctor, business consultant, educator, and sportswoman. She was born here in 1950.
 Sylvia Rwabogo: Journalist and politician, who served as the District Woman Representative for Kabarole District, in the 10th Parliament (2016–2021),

See also
 Toro sub-region
 List of cities and towns in Uganda

References

External links

A peep into Fort Portal town
 Google Map of Fort Portal with Coordinates
Fort Portal Travel Information

 
Kabarole District
Populated places in Western Region, Uganda
Cities in the Great Rift Valley
Toro sub-region